Kingsley Field Air National Guard Base is the home base of the Oregon Air National Guard's 173rd Fighter Wing (173 FW).

History 
In 1928, the citizens of Klamath Falls approved the sale of $50,000 worth of bonds to construct an airport. The airport was known as the Klamath Falls Municipal Airport and consisted of gravel runways and one fixed-base operator. In 1942, the airport was selected as a site for a Naval Air Station. Known as NAS Klamath Falls during World War II, the airport was transferred from the U.S. Navy back to civilian use in late 1945.

In 1954, the airport was selected as a site for United States Air Force base and the airfield returned to military control. The former naval air station was then placed under the jurisdiction of the Air Defense Command (ADC). The 408th Fighter Group (Air Defense) was activated at Klamath Falls Municipal Airport on 8 April 1956, being assigned to the 28th Air Division.

In 1957, the airport was dedicated as Kingsley Field in honor of Lieutenant David Kingsley, who earned the Medal of Honor during World War II. The 827th Aircraft Control and Warning Squadron (later 827th Radar Squadron) was activated at Kingsley Field in 1957. While the administrative and support sections of the squadron were located on the airfield, the squadrons operational element and radars were located nearby at what was named Keno Air Force Station in February 1959.

ADC reassigned Kingsley Field to the 25th Air Division on 1 March 1959; transferred to Portland Air Defense Sector on 15 April 1960; transferred to 26th Air Division on 1 April 1966; reassigned to 25th Air Division on 15 September 1969. The 408th Fighter Group was inactivated on 1 October 1970.

Operational ADC fighter-interceptor squadrons which operated from Kingsley Field were:
 518th Fighter-Interceptor Squadron, 8 June 1956 – 1 July 1959 (non-operational)
 322d Fighter-Interceptor Squadron, 1 April 1959 – 30 September 1968 (F-101B Voodoo)
 59th Fighter-Interceptor Squadron, 30 September 1968 – 17 December 1969 (F-101B/F Voodoo])
 460th Fighter-Interceptor Squadron, 1 December 1969 – 16 April 1971 (F-106A/B Delta Dart)

The 827th Radar Squadron operated Ground Control-Intercept (GCI) radar from nearby Keno Air Force Station, receiving host station services and support from Kingsley Field, 1 September 1957 – 1 October 1979.

In 1978, the Department of Defense chose to close Kingsley Field as an active duty Air Force installation as part of the inactivation of Aerospace Defense Command and the transfer of its personnel and assets to Tactical Air Command. The installation was transferred to Air National Guard control for fighter operations, and it has been operated by the Oregon Air National Guard ever since.

Future 
In August 2020, it was announced that Kingsley Field will host the Air Force's first F-15EX formal training unit from 2022. The F-15EX is intended to replace the aging F-15C/D Eagle, which is expected to run out of service life by the mid-2020s.

References

Installations of the United States Air National Guard
Installations of the United States Air Force in Oregon
Buildings and structures in Klamath Falls, Oregon
Airports established in 1928
Airports in Klamath County, Oregon
World War II airfields in the United States
1928 establishments in Oregon